Wing commander (Wg Cdr in the RAF, the IAF, and the PAF, WGCDR in the RNZAF and RAAF, formerly sometimes W/C in all services) is a senior commissioned rank in the British Royal Air Force and air forces of many countries which have historical British influence, including many Commonwealth countries but not including Canada (since Unification) and South Africa. It is sometimes used as the English translation of an equivalent rank in countries which have a non-English air force-specific rank structure. It ranks immediately above squadron leader and immediately below group captain.

It has a NATO ranking code of OF-4. It is equivalent to commander in the Royal and United States Navies, as well as to lieutenant colonel in the British Army, the Royal Marines, and the United States Army, Air Force and Marine Corps. The equivalent rank in the Women's Auxiliary Air Force and the Women's Royal Air Force (until 1968) and in Princess Mary's Royal Air Force Nursing Service (until 1980) was wing officer. The equivalent rank in the Royal Observer Corps (until 1995) was observer commander, which had a similar rank insignia.

Origins

On 1 April 1918, the newly created RAF adopted its officer rank titles from the British Army, with Royal Naval Air Service captains and Royal Flying Corps colonels officially becoming colonels in the RAF although there was some inconsistency in practice with some former naval officers using their former ranks unofficially. In response to the proposal that the RAF should use its own rank titles, it was suggested that the RAF might use the Royal Navy's officer ranks, with the word "air" inserted before the naval rank title. For example, the rank that later became wing commander would have been "air commander". Although the Admiralty objected to this simple modification of their rank titles, it was agreed that the RAF might base many of its officer rank titles on naval officer ranks with differing pre-modifying terms. It was also suggested that RAF lieutenant colonels might be entitled reeves or wing-leaders. However, the rank title wing commander was chosen as wings were typically commanded by RAF lieutenant colonels and the term wing commander had been used in the Royal Naval Air Service. The rank of wing commander was introduced in August 1919 and has been used continuously since then.

Usage
In the early years of the RAF, a wing commander commanded a flying wing, typically a group of three or four aircraft squadrons. In current usage a wing commander is more likely to command a wing which is an administrative sub-division of an RAF station. A flying squadron is normally commanded by a wing commander but is occasionally commanded by a squadron leader for small units. In the Air Training Corps, a wing commander is usually the officer commanding of a wing.

Insignia and command flag

The rank insignia is based on the three gold bands of commanders in the Royal Navy and consists of three narrow light blue bands over slightly wider black bands. This is worn on both the lower sleeves of the tunic or on the shoulder of the flight suit or the casual uniform.

The command pennant is two triangular command pennants used in the RAF. Two thin red lines differentiate this one from the other.

During 1941-45 RAF Fighter Command's wing leaders (of wing commander rank) were also allowed to use their own initials as aircraft identification letters on their personal aircraft, e.g., Wing Commander Roland Beamont's personal Hawker Tempest, JN751, was coded "R-B", Wing Commander John Robert Baldwin's personal Hawker Typhoon was coded "J-B".

Other air forces

The rank of wing commander is also used in a number of the air forces in the Commonwealth, including the Bangladesh Air Force, Ghana Air Force, Nigerian Air Force, Indian Air Force, Namibian Air Force, Pakistan Air Force, Royal Australian Air Force, Royal New Zealand Air Force, and the Sri Lankan Air Force. It is also used in the Egyptian Air Force, Hellenic Air Force, Royal Air Force of Oman, Royal Thai Air Force and the Air Force of Zimbabwe. The Royal Malaysian Air Force used the rank until it was retitled as that of lieutenant colonel in 1973, with the same rank insignia.

Royal Canadian Air Force
Canada is a unique exception. Due to the unification of the Canadian Armed Forces in 1968, the air force rank titles are the same as those of the Canadian Army. However, like their Commonwealth counterparts, rank braids are pearl grey and increase from OF-1 to OF-5 in half strip increments. The decision was taken not to retain the historic rank titles for the RCAF due to it being deemed "too confusing."

In the 1990s, the Canadian Forces Air Command (the post-1968 RCAF) altered the structure of those bases under its control, redesignating them as wings. The commander of such an establishment was re-designated as the "wing commander" (or "Wg Comd"). Like the United States Air Force usage, the term "wing commander" (as used in the Canadian Forces and again in the RCAF) is an appointment, not a rank. A wing commander usually holds the rank of colonel.

On 16 August 2011, the Government of Canada announced that the name "Air Command" was being changed to the air force's original historic name of Royal Canadian Air Force. Though traditional insignia for the RCAF was restored in 2015, there has been no restoration of the traditional RCAF officer rank structure that paralleled the RAF.

United States Air Force
In the United States Air Force (USAF), a wing commander is a command billet, not a rank. The equivalent USAF rank is most often a colonel (some USAF wings are commanded by a brigadier general) who typically has command of an air wing with several group commanders reporting to him/her.

United States Navy
In the United States Navy (USN), a wing commander is also a command billet, not a rank.  The equivalent USN rank is a captain.  Navy wing commanders are either Naval Aviators or Naval Flight Officers who typically have command of a carrier air wing or a "functional" air wing or air group such as a strike fighter wing, a patrol and reconnaissance wing, a tactical air control group, or a training air wing, with several squadron commanding officers reporting to him/her.  Those officers commanding carrier air wings are called "CAG," dating back to when carrier air wings were called carrier air groups.  Those officers commanding functional air wings and air groups are called "commodore."  Unlike USAF, "group" commands in USN are either equal to or senior to an air wing.

Civil Air Patrol (United States Air Force Auxiliary)
The Civil Air Patrol, the volunteer auxiliary of the USAF, follows the USAF rank structure. The CAP divides the nation into 52 wings (each corresponding to a state, territory, and District of Columbia). Each wing is headed by a CAP colonel, who holds the position of wing commander.

Notable wing commanders

 Douglas BaderWorld War II fighter pilot and double amputee, was the first commander to lead formations of three or more squadrons during the Battle of Britain
 Roland BeamontWorld War II fighter pilot and post-war test pilot
 Abdel Latif Boghdadipilot in the Egyptian Air Force turned politician
 M. Hamidullah Khan TJ, SH, BP Fought two wars in South Asia, 1965 Indo Pak War, Bangladesh War of Independence 1971. First and third provost marshal and commander of Ground Defense Command of the Bangladesh Air Force. 
 Pierre ClostermannWorld War II fighter pilot and author of The Big Show
 Linda Corbouldfirst woman to command a RAAF flying squadron
 Roald DahlWorld War II fighter pilot, and famous novelist. His record of five aerial victories has been confirmed by post-war research and cross-referenced in Axis records. (He ended the war with the temporary rank of wing commander; substantive rank was squadron leader)
 Roly Falktest pilot on the maiden flight of the Avro Vulcan
 Brendan "Paddy" Finucanetop ranking RAF World War II ace with 32 kills. A native of Rathmines, Dublin, Ireland (who emigrated to Britain with his family in 1936), he is the youngest wing commander in the history of the RAF. He was promoted to the rank in 1942 at age 21 and was shot down and killed shortly thereafter
 Preller Geldenhuyscombat pilot in the Rhodesian Air Force, survivor of the Rhodesian War and author of Rhodesian Air Force Operations
 Guy Gibsoncommanding officer of 617 Squadron and leader of the "Dam Busters" raid
 Andy Greencurrent holder of the land speed record and first person to break the sound barrier on land
 Walter "Taffy" Holden (Holden%27s Lightning flight)  Commander of No. 33 Maintenance Unit RAF; inadvertently took off in an English Electric Lightning during ground testing; managed to land safely despite his only prior experience being with light training aircraft.
 Humphrey de Verd Leighinventor of the Leigh light which was developed to spotlight U-boats as they surfaced at night. The Leigh light is reputed to have changed the course of the Battle of the Atlantic in World War II
 Norman MacmillanAviation author and pilot of the first attempt to fly around the world in 1922.
 Mervyn Middlecoatfighter pilot who belonged to Pakistan Air Force
 Nouman Ali KhanWing Commander of the Pakistan Air Force who downed an Indian Air Force MiG-21 piloted by Abhinandan Varthamanand and crashed in Pakistan administered Kashmir on 27 February 2019. He was conferred with Sitar-e-Jurat for his bravery
 Abhinandan VarthamanWing Commander of the Indian Air Force. His aircraft was shot down in an aerial dogfight and he was held captive for 60 hours in Pakistan.
 Ken WallisWorld War II fighter pilot, aircraft engineer, and multiple world record holder in autogyro aircraft flight
 Adrian Warburtonlegendary for his role as a reconnaissance aviator in the defence of Malta; shot down over Germany on 12 April 1944, aged 26. It was only in 2002 that his remains were found in the wreckage of his plane
 Dennis Wheatleythe popular historical novelist and thriller writer was granted a commission and brought into Whitehall's World War II Joint Planning Staff
 Russell Williams British-born Canadian convicted rapist and murderer and former Colonel in the Canadian Forces
 Peter OvertonA news presenter & journalist for the 9 Network Australia and 60 Minutes Australia. He is a Wing Commander in the Royal Australian Air Force as a specialist reserve public affairs officer.
 Michael Sutton OBE - led the first Typhoon deployment on operations over Iraq and Syria. The only typhoon pilot to have used the aircraft's gun in combat. Author of bestselling memoir Typhoon.

See also

 Air force officer rank insignia
 British and U.S. military ranks compared
 Comparative military ranks
 RAF officer ranks
 Ranks of the RAAF
 Wing Commander, a popular computer game series

References

Military ranks of the Commonwealth
Military ranks of Australia
Former military ranks of Canada
Military ranks of the Royal Air Force
Air force ranks
Pakistan Air Force ranks
Military ranks of Bangladesh
Military ranks of Sri Lanka
Military ranks of the Indian Air Force